Mojtaba Moharrami (born 16 April 1964) is an Iranian former football player and now coach. He is current head coach of Persepolis Reserves.

Moharrami made 37 appearances for the Iran national football team. He was captain of Iran national football team at Asian Cup 1996.
Regardless of the fact that he has been one of the best left-backs of Iranian football history, he is mostly known for his several controversial actions in different matches. In the infamous Persepolis–Esteghlal derby in 1993, he was accused to be in the lime light of the brawl and was banned for three years. In his rare appearance in a live TV show in 2011, he claimed that the punishment which ruined his career was too severe and unfair. He also was banned for a year for attacking referee Jamal Al Sharif during Iran–Japan match in 1992 Asian Cup. Despite his actions towards referees and opponents in the games, he has remained a popular figure in the Iranian football history and considered an icon. During Persepolis matches, whenever the crowd is not satisfied with referee's decisions they chant Moharrami's name to remind the referee that he would have been kicked if Moharrami were in the game.

Career statistics

International goals

Honours

Club 
Persepolis
Asian Cup Winners' Cup (1): 1990–91
Runner-up (1): 1992–93
Iranian Football League (1): 1996–97
Runner-up (2): 1991–92, 1992–93
Qods League Runner-up (1): 1989–90
Hazfi Cup (1): 1991–92
Tehran Provincial League (3): 1988, 1989, 1990
Runner-up (1): 1991

Country 
Iran
Asian Games Gold Medal (1): 1990

References

External links
 

Living people
1965 births
Iranian footballers
Iran international footballers
Association football defenders
Persepolis F.C. players
Shahin FC players
Niroye Zamini players
Al-Arabi SC (Qatar) players
1988 AFC Asian Cup players
1992 AFC Asian Cup players
1996 AFC Asian Cup players
Asian Games gold medalists for Iran
Asian Games medalists in football
Footballers at the 1990 Asian Games
Footballers at the 1994 Asian Games
Medalists at the 1990 Asian Games
Qatar Stars League players